Zachary Boychuk (born October 4, 1989) is a Canadian professional ice hockey centre who is currently playing for Eisbären Berlin in the Deutsche Eishockey Liga (DEL). He was drafted by the Carolina Hurricanes in the first round, 14th overall, in the 2008 NHL Entry Draft and played parts of 7 seasons in the NHL with Carolina Huricanes, Pittsburgh Penguins and Nashville Predators.

He played major junior with the Lethbridge Hurricanes of the Western Hockey League (WHL). Boychuk has had a 3-year career in the KHL with Sibir Novosibirsk and before moving on to Europe having won titles in Switzerland and Germany with SC Bern (2018-19), and Eisbären Berlin (2020-21, 2021-22) respectively.

He has represented Team Canada at three Spengler Cups - winning the 2017, and 2019 editions.

Playing career
Boychuk began his major junior career in 2005–06 with the Lethbridge Hurricanes of the WHL. After recording 51 points in 64 games in his rookie season, he improved to 31 goals and 91 points in 69 games the next season, third overall in the WHL.

In Boychuk's draft year, he finished with 33 goals and 72 points, good for WHL East Second All-Star honours. Leading the Hurricanes to the 2008 WHL Finals – he had 21 points in 18 playoff games – Lethbridge was, however, swept by eventual Memorial Cup winners, the Spokane Chiefs. Heading into the 2008 NHL Entry Draft, Boychuk was ranked eighth by the Central Scouting Service among North American skaters. He was chosen fourteenth overall by the Carolina Hurricanes.

After attending the Hurricanes' prospect camp in July, he went into surgery for his left wrist, which he had injured during the 2008 WHL playoffs. He was cleared to play during the 2008–09 NHL preseason and on October 4, 2008, the Hurricanes signed him to a three-year, entry level contract.

He made his NHL debut against the Los Angeles Kings on October 17, 2008 becoming the first Hurricanes player since Eric Staal in 2003 to make his NHL debut in his draft year. He was returned to Lethbridge after appearing in two NHL games. Upon being sent down, Boychuk completed his fourth season of WHL hockey by registering 57 points (28g, 29a) in 43 regular-season games and leading the team with 13 points (7g, 6a) in 11 playoff contests.

He shared the Harry Ingarfield Memorial Award as Lethbridge's team MVP and won the team's plus/minus award.

He was an assistant captain for Team Canada in the 2009 U-20 World Junior Championship in Ottawa, his second WJC, and helped Canada win the gold medal for the second straight year.

He was reassigned by Carolina from Lethbridge (WHL) to the Albany River Rats on  April 10, 2009. At the beginning of the 2009–10 he attended the Carolina Hurricanes training camp. He made his AHL debut with Albany and recorded one assist for his first career professional point at WBS on April 10, 2009.

He registered his first NHL goal Saturday February 13, 2010 against the New Jersey Devils. It was the opening goal of the game and scored against goaltender Martin Brodeur at the 16:47 mark of the first period. Assisted by Brandon Sutter, and Brett Carson.
On December 29, 2010 he had his first multi-goal NHL game, with two goals, against the Ottawa Senators.

During the shortened 2012–13 season, on January 31, 2013 he was claimed off waivers from the Hurricanes by the Pittsburgh Penguins. In going scoreless in seven games with the Penguins, he was again placed on waivers and subsequently claimed by the Nashville Predators on March 5, 2013. On March 21, 2013 he was re-claimed by the Hurricanes on waivers. On December 6, 2013, after starting the season in the AHL, Boychuk was recalled by the Hurricanes after an injury to veteran defenseman Mike Komisarek.

On July 7, 2015, Boychuk continued his tenure with the Hurricanes in signing a one-year, two-way contract with the club which would pay him $600,000 in the NHL or $200,000 in the AHL with his salary being guaranteed at $250,000. In the 2015–16 season, Boychuk was directly assigned to the AHL with the Checkers. Boychuk was unable to assert the impact from previous seasons with the Checkers and after producing 25 points in 56 games he was loaned by the Hurricanes to the Bakersfield Condors, an affiliate to the Edmonton Oilers in exchange for Andrew Miller on March 7, 2016.

As a free agent at the expiration of his NHL contract with the Hurricanes, on September 8, 2016, Boychuk agreed to a professional try-out contract from the Arizona Coyotes to attend their training camp. After NHL, he agreed to his first contract abroad, playing in the Russian-based KHL, one season for Sibir Novosibirsk followed by a season tenure with Slovakian entrant, HC Slovan Bratislava.

On June 1, 2018, Boychuk joined his third KHL club in as many seasons, agreeing to a one-year deal with Russian club, Severstal Cherepovets. In the ensuing 2018–19 season, Boychuk struggled to find his place with Severstal, posting just 4 points in 25 games. On November 19, 2018, he left the KHL and signed for the remainder of the season with Swiss club, SC Bern of the National League. SC Bern won the NL championship in 2019 and Boychuk assisted on the championship winning goal scored by Eric Blum.

On December 27, 2019, Boychuk joined HC Fribourg-Gottéron of the National League (NL) for the remainder of the 2019–20 season as a replacement for injured David Desharnais.

International play

Prior to Boychuk's draft year in 2007–08, he competed in the 2007 Super Series, an under-20 eight-game series between Russia and Team Canada. The series marked the 35th anniversary of the 1972 Summit Series between Canada and the Soviet Union. Boychuk contributed 4 goals and 2 assists in 7 games as Canada dominated and eventually won the series 7–0–1.

Boychuk would also compete for Team Canada in the 2008 World Junior Championships and 2009 World Junior Championships, helping Canada to a fourth and fifth straight gold medal in the Czech Republic and Canada.

In late December 2017, he helped Team Canada win the prestigious Spengler Cup in Davos, scoring one goal in the championship game.

Personal
His twin sister Corissa Boychuk was an international trampolinist who won medals at world championships between 2009 and 2013. She retired after the 2013 World Championship. They also have a younger sister Chelsie who does competitive gymnastics.

Career statistics

Regular season and playoffs

International

Awards and honours

References

External links

1989 births
Living people
Albany River Rats players
Bakersfield Condors players
SC Bern players
Canadian ice hockey centres
Canadian expatriate ice hockey players in Slovakia
Canadian expatriate ice hockey players in Russia
Canadian people of Ukrainian descent
Carolina Hurricanes draft picks
Carolina Hurricanes players
Charlotte Checkers (2010–) players
Eisbären Berlin players
Ice hockey people from Alberta
Lethbridge Hurricanes players
Nashville Predators players
National Hockey League first-round draft picks
People from Airdrie, Alberta
Pittsburgh Penguins players
Severstal Cherepovets players
HC Sibir Novosibirsk players
HC Slovan Bratislava players
Canadian twins
Twin sportspeople
Canadian expatriate ice hockey players in the United States
Canadian expatriate ice hockey players in Switzerland
Canadian expatriate ice hockey players in Germany